Luiz Carlos Filgueira, known as Filgueira (born 10 January 1967) is a Brazilian football coach and a former player. He also holds Portuguese citizenship.

He played 15 seasons and 400 games in the Primeira Liga for Belenenses, Chaves, Vitória de Setúbal and Marítimo.

Club career
He made his Primeira Liga debut for Chaves on 23 October 1988 as a starter in a 1–0 victory over Académico de Viseu.

References

1967 births
Footballers from Brasília
Living people
Brazilian footballers
Brasília Futebol Clube players
G.D. Chaves players
Brazilian expatriate footballers
Expatriate footballers in Portugal
Primeira Liga players
Vitória F.C. players
C.S. Marítimo players
C.F. Os Belenenses players
Liga Portugal 2 players
Brazilian football managers
Brazilian expatriate football managers
Expatriate football managers in Portugal
Association football defenders